Tudor Manor is a historic apartment building at 524 Sheridan Square in Evanston, Illinois. The brick three-flat was built in 1916. Architect Louis C. Bouchard designed the building in the Tudor Revival style. The building's design includes multiple large bay windows, an arched entrance, a crenellated roofline, and multiple ornate chimneys. Each apartment originally included amenities such as a sunroom, a library, a maid's room, a fireplace, mahogany detailing, and a vacuum cleaning system.

The building was added to the National Register of Historic Places on March 15, 1984.

References

Buildings and structures on the National Register of Historic Places in Cook County, Illinois
Residential buildings on the National Register of Historic Places in Illinois
Buildings and structures in Evanston, Illinois
Apartment buildings in Illinois
Tudor Revival architecture in Illinois
Residential buildings completed in 1916